Cerovo is a village in the municipality of Želino, North Macedonia.

Demographics
As of the 2021 census, Cerovo had 368 residents with the following ethnic composition:
Albanians 327
Persons for whom data are taken from administrative sources 41

According to the 2002 census, the village had a total of 511 inhabitants. Ethnic groups in the village include:
Albanians 510
Macedonians 1

References

External links

Villages in Želino Municipality
Albanian communities in North Macedonia